Water polo events were contested at the 1985 Summer Universiade in Kobe, Japan.

References
 Universiade water polo medalists on HickokSports

1985 Summer Universiade
Universiade
1985
1985